The WINSTONgolf Senior Open is a men's senior (over 50) professional golf tournament on the European Senior Tour. It has been held since 2012 at WINSTONgolf, Vorbeck in Northern Germany. From 2012 to 2015 it was played on the Open course while from 2016 to 2018 it was held on the Links course. The event returned to the Open course in 2019.

The 2021 event was played as an invitational event with 20 professionals competing over 36 holes.

Winners

Notes

References

External links
Coverage on the European Senior Tour's official site

European Senior Tour events
Golf tournaments in Germany
Recurring sporting events established in 2012
2012 establishments in Germany